The American Association, Limited, Office Building, at 2215 Cumberland Ave. in Middlesboro, Kentucky, United States, was built in c.1890.  It was listed on the National Register of Historic Places in 1978.

It is a two-and-a-half-story building, somewhat Richardsonian Romanesque in style.

It was deemed "important historically because of its ties with establishment of the town. Its founder, Alexander Arthur, a Canadian, obtained British backing to form the American Association, Limited, that was to finance mining operations in southeast Kentucky and northeast Tennessee and the construction of Middlesboro, which was to serve as headquarters for these activities. The 2-1/2-story, brick structure was built as offices for the American Association, Limited."

References

		
National Register of Historic Places in Bell County, Kentucky
Romanesque Revival architecture in Kentucky
Office buildings completed in 1890
1890 establishments in Kentucky
Office buildings on the National Register of Historic Places
Middlesboro, Kentucky